The Central Committee of the 24th Congress of the Communist Party of the Soviet Union was in session from 1971 until 1976. It elected, at its 1st Plenary Session, the 24th Politburo, the 24th Secretariat and the 24th Party Control Committee of the Communist Party of the Soviet Union.

Plenums
The Central Committee was not a permanent institution. It convened plenary sessions. 11 CC plenary sessions were held between the 24th Congress and the 25th Congress. When the CC was not in session, decision-making power was vested in the internal bodies of the CC itself; that is, the Politburo and the Secretariat. None of these bodies were permanent either; typically they convened several times a month.

Composition

Members

Candidates

References

Citations

Bibliography
 

Central Committee of the Communist Party of the Soviet Union
1971 establishments in the Soviet Union
1976 disestablishments in the Soviet Union